USS Delaware was a steamer acquired by the Union Navy for use during the American Civil War. She had a very active naval career as a gunboat for over three years, and after the war served as a revenue cutter for over 37 years. The steamer was sold to the private sector in 1903, and disappeared from shipping registers in 1919.

Origins
The Delaware—a sidewheel steamer—was the fourth ship to be named Delaware by the Navy. She was built in 1861 at the Harlan & Hollingsworth Iron Shipbuilding Company of Wilmington, Delaware. The steamboat, initially called the Edenton, was ordered in 1860 by the Albemarle Steam Packet Company. This company was made up of 24 businessmen from northeastern North Carolina who wanted to operate a steamboat in the Albemarle Sound area of North Carolina. According to the agreement, the steamboat would be built using "timbers of bar iron, attached to the hull plating via keepers." The Packet Company's president, Edward Wood of Edenton, North Carolina, grew concerned over the deteriorating situation between the North and the South. Wood ultimately stopped payments over fear that the steamboat, now called the Virginia Dare would be detained. (Hayes Collection, SHC) Later the Virginia Dare was purchased by the Union Navy on 14 October 1861, and renamed USS Delaware. Lieutenant S. P. Quackenbush was placed in command.

Assigned to the North Atlantic blockade
Delawares task—during the course of her patrols—was to sink or capture Confederate ships, and to bombard forts and other military installations. Assigned to the North Atlantic Blockading Squadron, Delaware sailed from Philadelphia, Pennsylvania on 12 December 1861 and stood up the James River on 26 December 1861 on patrol. On 12 January 1862, she sailed for Hatteras Inlet, North Carolina as part of General Burnside's expedition against Confederate forces in the North Carolina sounds. Delaware took part in the capture of Roanoke Island from 7 to 8 February 1862; and on 10 February 1862 she took part in the attack on Elizabeth City, North Carolina, where she shared in the capture or destruction of five Confederate gunboats and two schooners.

On 19 February 1862, Delaware and seven other gunboats made a reconnaissance up the Chowan River. The purpose of this voyage was to destroy two railroad bridges above the town of Winton, North Carolina. It was during this foray that she was nearly ambushed at the town wharf by a force of Confederate soldiers and artillery hiding among the brush near the dock. Union commander Rush Hawkins, who was in the yardarm of the foremast, spotted the Confederates and warned the helmsman in time to sheer off. Delawares superstructure was severely shot up by rifle fire, but fortunately the artillery overshot its mark. After pulling away from the dock Delaware returned fire and dispersed the Confederate militia. The next day Delaware and the other gunboats returned to Winton. Finding it deserted, the town was burned, partly in retaliation for the ambush. (Barrett 1963)

From 13 to 14 March 1862, Delaware participated in the capture of New Bern, North Carolina, and captured four vessels.

Virginia river operations
Delaware arrived in Hampton Roads on 2 June 1862 for service in Virginia waters until 30 October 1862. She had several encounters with enemy batteries and captured a number of small craft which she sent in as prizes.
 
Until 5 April 1863, Delaware cruised in the James and York Rivers and Chesapeake Bay, then on the North Carolina coast until 27 November 1863, when she sailed to Baltimore, Maryland, for repairs. On 27 March 1864, she returned to the waters of Virginia, to patrol and perform picket duty, transport men and ordnance stores, and clear the rivers of torpedoes (mines) until the end of the war.

U.S. Revenue Cutter Service history
Delaware arrived at Washington Navy Yard on 27 July 1865 and was decommissioned from U.S. Navy service on 5 August 1865, after serving over three years. On 31 August 1865, she was sold to The Department of the Treasury for $40,000 (less 10-percent) and commissioned USRC Delaware on 12 September 1865. After being fitted out as a revenue cutter in Baltimore, Maryland, she was first assigned to Galveston, Texas in 1865. She was repaired in Baltimore, Maryland in 1867 at a cost of $14,100 and was then reassigned to Mobile, Alabama in 1868.

In 1872 she was ordered to relieve the USRC Wilderness in New Orleans, Louisiana with orders to cruise to Mobile, Alabama "occasionally". She was extensively modified in 1873 for a cost of $11,500 and was renamed Louis McLane in June 1873 honoring the tenth Secretary of the Treasury Louis McLane. She was then ordered to Pensacola, Florida for duty where her cruising area was from Cedar Key, Florida to Biloxi, Mississippi. Louis McLane was assigned to a patrol that enforced neutrality laws in 1897. While operating near Indian Key, Florida on 20 June 1897, she seized the tug Dauntless bound for Cuba that was carrying 175 rifles, 300,000 rounds of ammunition, medical supplies and 27 men on board in violation of U.S. neutrality laws. Secretary of the Treasury Lyman J. Gage singled out Louis McLane in his 1897 report to congress for her enforcement action.

During the Spanish–American War, Louis McLane was stationed at Key West, Florida and commanded by First Lieutenant William E. Reynolds, assigned to the North Atlantic Squadron commanded by Rear Admiral William T. Sampson, USN. Louis McLane patrolled the submarine cable from Key West, Florida to Sanibel Island from 1898 to 1899.
 
She operated in the Gulf of Mexico for the rest of her career, mostly out of Key West, Florida from 1877 until she was decommissioned on 27 December 1902.

After over 37 years of revenue service, she was sold to J. A. Carney for $4,195 on 23 October 1903. She was re-documented as Louis Dolive on 31 March 1904.

Notes

Citations

References
 
 
  
 
 
  No ISBN
  
 
 Wood Family Papers in the Hayes Collection, Southern Historical Collection, UNC Chapel Hill, North Carolina.

External links
Inventory of the Hayes Collection, in the Southern Historical Collection, UNC-Chapel Hill.

Ships built by Harlan and Hollingsworth
Ships of the Union Navy
Steamships of the United States Navy
Gunboats of the United States Navy
American Civil War patrol vessels of the United States
1861 ships